The infectious disease hepatitis C is caused by the hepatitis C virus (HCV), which affects the liver. During the initial infection, people often have mild or no symptoms, and there is typically no symptoms early during chronic infection.  This condition can progress to scarring of the liver (fibrosis), and advanced scarring (cirrhosis).  Over many years however, it often leads to liver disease and occasionally cirrhosis. In some cases, those with cirrhosis will develop complications such as liver failure, liver cancer, or dilated blood vessels in the esophagus and stomach.

Although HCV was not discovered until April 1989, an estimated 170 million people worldwide are infected by hepatitis C. As of April 2014, 130—150 million globally suffer from chronic hepatitis C infection; a significant number develop cirrhosis of the liver or liver cancer.  Each year, 350,000 to 500,000 people die from hepatitis C-related liver diseases.  No vaccine is available at this time. The symptoms of infection can be medically managed when the disease is diagnosed early, and a proportion of patients can be cleared of the virus by a course of anti-viral medicines. Globally, an estimated 50–95% of people treated are cured. With more recently developed medications cure rates are around 80 to 95%. The symptoms of HCV infection, especially in its early stages, can be mild enough to conceal the fact of the disease; thus, some people do not seek treatment. As Live Aid founder Bob Geldof states, "Stigma, shame and fear can suffocate awareness. These barriers prevent people from getting tested, receiving treatment, and clearing themselves of this disease". A number of celebrities diagnosed with the disease have decided to go public to raise awareness about hepatitis C and to encourage more people to get tested for the disease.

Acting

Business

Music

Politics

Science and medicine

Sports

Writing

Miscellaneous

See also
 World Hepatitis Day

References

Hepatitis C